Tiger Trap was an American twee-pop foursome composed of high school friends Angela Loy and Rose Melberg, with Heather Dunn and Jen Braun. The group recorded for K Records. The name "Tiger Trap" comes from the very first Calvin and Hobbes cartoon, and was used prior to the formation of the band by Rose Melberg for a solo set in 1991 at the first night of the International Pop Underground Convention, Love Rock Revolution Girl Style Now, inspiring the Beat Happening song of the same name. Formed in Sacramento, California in 1992, they managed to garner something of a cult following before disbanding only a year later. Their last concert took place at Bottom of the Hill, San Francisco, in December 1993. Bands they played with include Heavenly, Unwound, Shadowy Men on a Shadowy Planet, Girl Trouble, Mecca Normal, Beat Happening, and Tsunami.

Along with Beat Happening, Lois, Tullycraft, and Black Tambourine, Tiger Trap is considered to be one of the most influential bands of the American twee pop movement.  Melberg went on to become a solo artist as well as playing with the bands The Softies, Go Sailor, and Gaze.  Dunn went on to play drums with Lois, the reformed Raincoats, and Dub Narcotic Sound System.

Discography

Singles & EPs
 "Words and Smiles" from a split 7-inch with Bratmobile (Four Letter Words Records, 1992)
 "Supercrush" b/w "You and Me" and "Hiding" (released as volume 36 of the International Pop Underground series, 1993)
 Sour Grass EP (K Records, 1993)
 "Alien Space Song" from split single with Henry's Dress (Slumberland Records, 1994)

Studio albums
 Tiger Trap (K Records, 1993)

Compilations and other appearances
 "Baby Blue", from Julep (Another Yoyo Studio Compilation) (Yoyo Recordings, 1993)
 "Hiding" re-released on the International Hip Swing compilation [assembled of songs from the International Pop Underground singles series] (K Records, 1993)
"Supreme Nothing", from the Stars Kill Rock compilation (Kill Rock Stars, 1992)
 "Girl with a Guitar" from The Blood Orgy of the Leather Girls soundtrack (Planet Pimp Records, PPR-009, 1994)

References

External links
 [ Tiger Trap at allmusic]

All-female bands
Indie pop groups from California
Indie rock musical groups from California
K Records artists
Musical groups from Sacramento, California
Musical groups established in 1992